Sonya Tayeh is a New York City-based choreographer. She has worked nationally and internationally across the worlds of dance and theater.

She has earned several accolades for her work, including the Tony award for her choreography work on the Broadway production of Moulin Rouge!, Emmy nominations for Fox's So You Think You Can Dance, and the Lucille Lortel and Obie Awards for “Outstanding Choreography” for her work on David Henry Hwang's dance-play Kung Fu, for which she also received a Drama Desk nomination.

Life and career

Early life and education
Tayeh was born in Brooklyn, New York and raised in Detroit, Michigan, the daughter of a Lebanese mother and Palestinian father. She has two sisters and one half-brother. Tayeh started dancing at age 15 when she began frequenting hip-hop and house dance parties with her sister. She started studying ballet and modern dance—as a subject—at age 17 when she was a student at Henry Ford Community College. Although Tayeh was a freestyle house dancer in her youth, she didn't take any formal dance classes until she was 18 and a student 
at Wayne State University. Before starting her training, she was denied by six dance studios who wouldn't let her take classes because they felt she was too old. In addition to her classes, Tayeh was a member of Counter Groove and Full Circle dance companies.

During her time at Wayne State, Tayeh drew on dance history, anatomy, and performance to develop a style that is built on core strength, aggressive partner interaction, quirky, and stylized movements. She graduated Wayne State in 2002 with a bachelor's degree in Dance.

Dance career and mainstream exposure

Since gaining mainstream exposure, Tayeh has choreographed tours and/or live events for Madonna, Florence and the Machine, Kylie Minogue, Kerli, and Miley Cyrus. She has also choreographed for Steed Lord and spent three years in residence with the Los Angeles Ballet. In 2010, she choreographed indie singer Lucy Schwartz' music video "Graveyard".

Tayeh choreographed the rock musical The Last Goodbye which is based on Romeo and Juliet and set to a soundtrack of music by Jeff Buckley. It premiered in 2010, but a revised version of the show with a new cast opened in September 2013 at the Old Globe Theatre in San Diego, California. In 2011, she choreographed San Jose Repertory Theatre's production of Spring Awakening. In 2014, she choreographed an off-Broadway play based on Bruce Lee's life called Kung Fu. It premiered February 24 with So You Think You Can Dance alumnus Cole Horibe playing the lead role.

In 2015 Martha Graham Dance Company commissioned a new work by Sonya Tayeh which she set to the music of Meredith Monk. It premiered in the company's New York season at The Joyce, Spring 2015 and has been performed by the company while on tour.

Sonya earned a Tony award for her choreography of the Broadway musical, "Moulin Rouge".

Choreography for So You Think You Can Dance

 Due to a shoulder injury, Mitchell Kelly was barred from performing in his routine. He was replaced for the evening by season 7's Robert Roldan and was automatically in danger of going home.

Teaching
Tayeh is a faculty member at the Edge Performing Arts Center in Los Angeles. She has also taught classes at The Hip Drop Dance Complex, Monsters of Contemporary, Broadway Dance Center, 24 Seven Dance, Hall of Fame Dance Challenge, Loyola Marymount University, NUVO, and Spotlight Dance Works.

Style and influences
Tayeh describes her choreography style as combat jazz because in her words "[i]t’s staccato, aggressive, and engaged, even when it’s slow." SanJose.com characterized it as "fearless, provocative and unique." She has several influences which include two of her former college professors Diane Mancinelli and Erica Wilson-Perkins, Broadway choreographers Twyla Tharp and Bill T. Jones, Mexican artist Frida Kahlo, her favorite choreographer Jiří Kylián, and her family. In addition, she calls competitive hip-hop dancer Salah her "idol" and Icelandic singer Björk her "ultimate hero".

Awards and recognition
In January 2009, Tayeh was named one of Dance magazine's "25 to Watch". In 2010, she was honored by the Detroit Arts Council and she made the December cover of Dance Teacher magazine. At Wayne State University there is a scholarship named after her called the Sonya Tayeh Endowment Fund that is awarded to students who want to pursue a degree in dance.

In July 2013, Tayeh was nominated for an Emmy Award for Outstanding Choreography for "Possibly Maybe", "Turning Page", and "Sail"—three routines she choreographed on season nine of So You Think You Can Dance. At the 2013 Primetime Emmy Awards ceremony, she joined the other seven choreography nominees and created a routine honoring dance that was performed just before the Outstanding Choreography award was presented. 2013 was the first year the Outstanding Choreography award was presented at the Primetime Emmys telecast rather than at the Creative Arts Emmys ceremony which takes place a week prior.

At the 74th Tonys, Tayeh received the Tony Award for Best Choreography for her work in Moulin Rouge!.

References

American female dancers
American dancers
So You Think You Can Dance choreographers
Living people
Artists from Detroit
1970s births
Tony Award winners
American people of Lebanese descent
American people of Palestinian descent
LGBT people from Michigan
21st-century American women